William Diehl (December 4, 1924 – November 24, 2006) was an American novelist and photojournalist.

Biography

Diehl was a successful photographer and journalist, when he began his novel-writing career at 50. His first novel, Sharky's Machine, was made into the 1981 film of the same name, directed and starred Burt Reynolds. Diehl saw it being shot on location in and around his hometown of Atlanta, Georgia. Its cast included Vittorio Gassman, Brian Keith, Charles Durning, Earl Holliman, Rachel Ward, Bernie Casey, Henry Silva, and Richard Libertini. It was the most successful box-office release of a film directed by Reynolds.

Diehl relocated to St. Simons Island, Georgia, in the early 1980s, and lived there for the next 15 years before returning to Atlanta. While living on St. Simons, he completed eight other novels, including Primal Fear, which was adapted into a 1996 film.

Death
Diehl died of an aortic aneurysm at Emory University Hospital in Atlanta on November 24, 2006, while working on his 10th novel. He was survived by five children, four (Cathy, Bill, Stan, and Melissa) from his first marriage, and one (Temple) from his second marriage.

Bibliography

 Sharky's Machine (1978)
 Chameleon (1981)
 Hooligans (1984)
 Thai Horse (1987)
 The Hunt (27) (1990)
 Primal Fear (1993)†
 Show of Evil (1995)†
 Reign in Hell (1997)†
 Eureka (2002)
 Seven Ways to Die (2012) with Kenneth John Atchity

 †Primal Fear, Show of Evil, and Reign in Hell are all part of a series featuring lawyer Martin Vail and killer Aaron Stampler.

References

External links
 
Primal Fear' author Diehl dies at 81", Associated Press, 26 November 2006

1924 births
2006 deaths
20th-century American novelists
United States Army Air Forces personnel of World War II
United States Army Air Forces soldiers
21st-century American novelists
People from Woodstock, Georgia
People from St. Simons, Georgia
American male novelists
20th-century American male writers
21st-century American male writers
Recipients of the Distinguished Flying Cross (United States)
Recipients of the Air Medal